Aspartyl/asparaginyl beta-hydroxylase (HAAH) is an enzyme that in humans is encoded by the ASPH gene. ASPH is an alpha-ketoglutarate-dependent hydroxylase, a superfamily non-haem iron-containing proteins.

Function 
This gene is thought to play an important role in calcium homeostasis. Alternative splicing of this gene results in five transcript variants which vary in protein translation, the coding of catalytic domains, and tissue expression. Variation among these transcripts impacts their functions which involve roles in the calcium storage and release process in the endoplasmic and sarcoplasmic reticulum as well as hydroxylation of aspartic acid and asparagine in epidermal growth factor-like domains of various proteins.

Clinical significance 

As early as 1996, the over-expression of HAAH was recognized as an indicator of carcinoma in humans. Further research has correlated elevated HAAH levels (variously in affected tissue or blood serum) with hepatocellular (liver) carcinoma adenocarcinoma (pancreatic cancer), colorectal cancer, prostate cancer. and lung cancer. The pancreatic study showed elevated HAAH only in diseased tissue, but not in adjacent normal and inflamed tissue.

Mutations in ASPH cause Traboulsi syndrome.

References

External links

Further reading 

 
 
 
 
 
 
 
 
 
 
 
 
 
 
 
 
 

Human 2OG oxygenases
EC 1.14.11